Lake Ingeborg is an American small alpine lake in the Sawtooth Mountains of the Sawtooth National Recreation Area in Elmore County, Idaho. It is accessible by Sawtooth National Forest Trail 462.

Lake Ingeborg is part of the Sawtooth Wilderness, and a wilderness permit must be obtained before visiting.  It is upstream from Spangle Lake and Little Spangle Lake.

References

See also
 List of lakes of the Sawtooth Mountains (Idaho)
 Sawtooth National Forest
 Sawtooth National Recreation Area
 Sawtooth Range (Idaho)

Lakes of Idaho
Lakes of Elmore County, Idaho
Glacial lakes of the United States
Glacial lakes of the Sawtooth Wilderness